Blankenburg is a railway station in the Pankow district of Berlin.

References

Blankenburg
Blankenburg
Blankenburg
Railway stations in Germany opened in 1877